Anthí Vasilantonáki (born April 9, 1996 in Athens, Greece) is a Greek female volleyball player. She plays for Galatasaray.

Career
On 14 May 2021, she signed a 1-year contract with the Galatasaray Women's Volleyball Team.

Personal
Her father is from Chania, and  her mother is Dutch from Amsterdam.

References

External links
Player profile at Volleybox.net

1996 births
Living people
Greek women's volleyball players
Dutch people of Greek descent
Greek people of Dutch descent
Volleyball players from Athens
Galatasaray S.K. (women's volleyball) players
Panathinaikos Women's Volleyball players
Expatriate volleyball players in Greece
Aydın Büyükşehir Belediyespor volleyballers
Serie A1 (women's volleyball) players